The Yellow Dog Plains is an area north and west of Marquette, Michigan, in the Upper Peninsula of Michigan, United States. The Yellow Dog River flows through it, as does the Salmon Trout River. The Salmon Trout River is unique in that it has a breeding population of coasters, a potamodromous form of brook trout. Coasters are virtually extinct from their native range on the south coast of Lake Superior, except for the Salmon Trout River. The Yellow Dog Plains is a remote and virtually untouched wilderness, aside from large scale logging operations.  There are extensive forests of Eastern white pine, with reports of some of the trees in the Yellow Dog Plains reaching heights of 31 meters.

Kennecott Minerals Corporation, a subsidiary of Rio Tinto, is currently considering opening a nickel-copper mine in the Yellow Dog Plains.   The plan, called the Eagle Project by Kennecott, has garnered both local support and opposition. Proponents claim that the mine would produce jobs, while the opposition claims the mine would produce irreversible environmental damage.

References

External links
Information about opposition to the Kennecott Eagle Project
The Eagle Project Website
Michigamme Highland regional landscape
Michigan DEQ Eagle Project web pages
Save the Wild UP

Geography of Marquette County, Michigan